The Play-offs of the 2001 Fed Cup Asia/Oceania Zone Group II were the final stages of the Group II Zonal Competition involving teams from Asia and Oceania. Using the positions determined in their pools, the eight teams faced off to determine their overall placing in the 2001 Fed Cup Asia/Oceania Zone Group II. The top two teams advanced to Group I for 2002.

Draw

First round

Hong Kong vs. Malaysia

Singapore vs. Philippines

Fiji vs. Sri Lanka

Repechage Round

Malaysia vs. Singapore

Fiji vs. Syria

Second round

Hong Kong vs. Philippines

Final Placements

  and  advanced to Group I for next year, where they respectively placed last and fourth in the same pool of six. Philippines, thus, was relegated back down to Group II for 2003.

See also
Fed Cup structure

References

External links
 Fed Cup website

2001 Fed Cup Asia/Oceania Zone